Elvir Ovčina (born July 16, 1976) is a Bosnian former professional basketball player. He played the center  position.

College career
Ovčina played high school basketball at Sycamore High School in Sycamore, Illinois. After high school, he played college basketball at the Syracuse University, with the Syracuse Orange men's basketball team from 1995 to 1999.

Professional career
Ovčina played professionally in Slovenia (Hopsi Polzela, Pivovarlna Laško), Germany (EWE Baskets Oldenburg, RheinEnergie Köln, Gießen 46ers), Greece (Olympiacos), Ukraine (Khimik), Belgium (Oostende) and Bosnia and Herzegovina (Bosna).

National team career
Ovčina played for the national basketball team of Bosnia and Herzegovina. He has played at the EuroBasket 1997, EuroBasket 1999, EuroBasket 2001, EuroBasket 2003 and EuroBasket 2005.

References

External links
EuroLeague profile
Interview for ULEB
Syracuse Bio

1976 births
Living people
Bosnia and Herzegovina expatriate basketball people in the United States
Bosnia and Herzegovina men's basketball players
BC Khimik players
BC Oostende players
Centers (basketball)
EWE Baskets Oldenburg players
Giessen 46ers players
KK Zlatorog Laško players
Köln 99ers players
Olympiacos B.C. players
Basketball players from Sarajevo
Syracuse Orange men's basketball players